Unitarian-Universalist Church, or Universalist-Unitarian Church, with or without the hyphen, may refer to the religion of Unitarian Universalism.

It may also refer to a local congregation, or a local congregation's church building, of this religion, including:

Unitarian-Universalist or Unitarian Universalist:
USA
 Unitarian-Universalist Church (Stamford, Connecticut)
 Follen Church Society-Unitarian Universalist, Lexington, Massachusetts
 Unitarian Universalist Church of Medford and the Osgood House, Medford, Massachusetts
 Unitarian Universalist Church (Cortland, New York)
 First Unitarian Universalist Church of Niagara, Niagara Falls, New York
 The Unitarian Universalist Church of Charlotte, North Carolina
 All Souls Unitarian-Universalist Church, Bellville, Ohio
 Unitarian Church in Charleston, South Carolina
 Edmonds Unitarian Universalist Church, Edmonds, Washington

Universalist-Unitarian or Universalist Unitarian:
USA
 Universalist-Unitarian Church, Waterville, Maine
 Universalist Unitarian Church of Joliet, Illinois
 Universalist Unitarian Church of Riverside, California

See also
 List of Unitarian, Universalist, and Unitarian Universalist churches

Unitarian Universalism